Israel Wood Powell (April 27, 1836 – February 25, 1915) was B.C.'s first superintendent of Indian Affairs and a businessman, politician and doctor. He served in the Legislative Assembly of Vancouver Island from 1863 to 1866.

Life 

He was born in Colborne, Norfolk County, Upper Canada (what is now Ontario), the son of Israel Wood Powell and Melinda Boss. His brother Walker later served in the legislative assembly for the Province of Canada. Powell was educated in Port Dover and at McGill University, where he studied medicine. He set up practice in Port Dover, moving in 1862 to Victoria, then part of the Colony of Vancouver Island. Powell was surgeon for the fire department and served in the militia. He was also a founding member of a freemason lodge there and later served as provincial grand master.

Powell was elected in 1863 to the House of Assembly of Vancouver Island.  He was defeated when he ran for election in 1866 and the 1868 BC elections. He served as chairman of the General Board of Education from 1867 to 1869. In 1865, he married Jane "Jennie" Brank.

He was a supporter of union with Canada and brought the first Canadian flag to BC on June 17, 1871 which he presented to the Victoria Fire Department on Jul 1st.  He got the flag from his close friend John A. Macdonald.

After BC joined Canada in 1871 he was named Superintendent of Indian Affairs a role which he held from 1872 to 1889.More sympathetic to native people than most of his contemporaries were (see Sir Joseph William Trutch), Powell supported claims to land and justice so long as they were consistent with his goal of assimilation. He was a constant critic of the provincial government’s resistance to providing aboriginal people with land and water rights, and he fought for the establishment of reserves so that Indians would have a sound economic base. During his tenure he helped to ensure that the sale of Lot 450, land that included tiyskʷat village, went through, as well as overseeing the removal of children from their homes to be sent to residential schools (when local schools could not be established), and the banning of potlatch, language and other Indigenous customs.

Residential schools 

Early in his career as superintendent, Powell took up the cause of what he viewed as the imperative to educate and “civilize” Indigenous children. Powell focused on the importance of establishing industrial education schools in isolated areas to turn Indigenous children into what he referred to as “useful members of society.”

He sought to establish several boarding schools across the province and particularly pushed for creating a school in Kamloops to address communities in the province’s interior. A school opened in Kamloops in 1890 and became one of the largest residential schools operated by Indian Affairs.

Lot 450 and Tla'amin people 

The 15,000-acre parcel of land known as Lot 450, situated on traditional Tla’amin, Klahoose and Homalco territory and encompassing several traditional villages and seasonal sites, continues to be a site of contention.

Land speculator and Victoria politician Robert Paterson Rithet purchased the timber lease under “dubious circumstances” in 1874. Tla’amin expressed its concerns over logging around their villages to Indian land commissioner Gilbert Malcolm Sproat.

Sproat agreed that the government should cease sales of the Tla’amin territory before official surveys could be made of their reserves. When Sproat brought these complaints forward to Powell, the superintendent was dismissive of Sproat and Tla’amin’s concerns and dissuaded the commissioner from visiting Tla’amin to attempt a compromise.

Lot 450 and the lands of the Tla’amin, Klahoose and Homalco nations were highly sought after for their economic potential and probably represented areas of potential industry to Powell, who was firmly in favour of the “civilizing” effects of industry on Indigenous peoples.

Later life 

In 1886, Powell became the first president of the Medical Council of British Columbia. He was also the first chancellor for the University of British Columbia. Powell died in Victoria at the age of 78.

Legacy 

A number of geographical features of British Columbia, including the Powell River and Powell Lake, were named in his honour.

In May 2021, The Tla'amin Nation submitted a request to Powell River city council requesting a change in the name due to the city being named after Powell. Vancouver Island University has since changed the name of their campus in the qathet region to tiwšɛmawtxw (tyew-shem-out), which means house of learning; the name was a gift to the institution from the Tla’amin Nation Executive Council to acknowledge VIU's "readiness and willingness to participate and engage in meaningful reconciliation."

On July 25, 2022, the regional hospital serving the catchment including the City of Powell River changed its name from 'Powell River General Hospital' to 'qathet General Hospital' at the request of the Tla'amin First Nation.

See also
Powell (surname) (disambiguation)

References

External links 
  
  
 
 
BC Names entry "Powell River (river)"

1836 births
1915 deaths
Members of the Legislative Assembly of Vancouver Island
People from Norfolk County, Ontario
McGill University Faculty of Medicine alumni
Academic staff of the University of British Columbia
Physicians from British Columbia
Canadian Freemasons
Colony of British Columbia (1866–1871) people